DIN 31636 is the German standard for the Romanization of Hebrew.

See also
DIN 31635

31636
Hebrew alphabet